Real space can mean:
Space in the real world, as opposed to some mathematical or fantasy space. This is often used in the context of science fiction when discussing concepts related to hyperspace.
In mathematics, a space which is not a complex space or a momentum space. These include:
Real coordinate space
Real manifold
Real vector space
Real affine space

Real spaces can also mean:
The book Real Spaces: World Art History and the Rise of Western Modernism, by David Summers.